KDKK (97.5 FM) is a radio station in Park Rapids, Minnesota. It broadcasts with 100,000 watts of effective radiated power. It is owned by De La Hunt Broadcasting, through licensee EC Broadcasting, and has a locally produced adult standards/nostalgia music format. It also carries the simulcast of the "Coffee Talk" program, which originates at KPRM, and is also simulcasted on KAKK.

Hourly news updates are provided by the CBS Radio Network. Originally, it had NBC Radio news.

In 2006, owners Ed and Carol De La Hunt were inducted into the Pavek Museum of Broadcasting Hall of Fame.

Their Park Rapids properties include KDKK, KPRM 870 and KXKK 92.5. They also own KKWB-FM in Bemidji, KAKK and KQKK in Walker, and KSKK in Verndale.

References

External links
De La Hunt Broadcasting

Radio stations in Minnesota
Adult standards radio stations in the United States
Nostalgia radio in the United States
Radio stations established in 1988